Carthage is an unincorporated community in Campbell County, Kentucky, United States.

References

Unincorporated communities in Campbell County, Kentucky
Unincorporated communities in Kentucky